Rosh ("head" or "leader") may refer to:

Rosh (biblical figure), a minor Biblical figure, mentioned in the Book of Genesis and possibly a nation listed in Ezekiel
"The Rosh", Rabbi Asher ben Jehiel (1250–1328) a prominent Talmudic scholar
Lea Rosh, German television journalist and publicist
Cognate with Amharic Ras (title) and Arabic Rais
Rosh (film), an upcoming Indian Hindi language crime thriller film

See also
Rosh Hashanah (disambiguation)
ROHS (disambiguation)